KDUO-LP, UHF analog channel 43, was a low-powered ShopHQ-affiliated television station licensed to Palm Desert, California, United States. Founded on February 19, 2008, the station was owned by the Louis Martinez Family Group. Since the channel's inception, it had been affiliated with the MTV Tr3́s network (now simply known as Tr3́s since July 2010). As of late 2015, KDUO-LP was no longer a Tr3s affiliate and KBLM-LP in Los Angeles had plans to turn KDUO-LP of Palm Springs, California into a translator of KPOM-LP.

The station's license was cancelled by the Federal Communications Commission (FCC) on June 1, 2018.

External links
MTV Tr3s website

DUO-LP
Television channels and stations established in 2007
2007 establishments in California
Defunct television stations in the United States
Television channels and stations disestablished in 2018
2018 disestablishments in California
DUO-LP